CenturyTel of Alabama, LLC is a telephone operating company owned by CenturyLink that provides local telephone service in Alabama.

The company was established in 2002 upon CenturyTel's purchase of lines from Verizon Communications. The lines in Alabama were split from Verizon South and Contel of the South, which were originally operating companies owned by GTE.

See also
Verizon South
GTE
CenturyLink

Lumen Technologies
Verizon Communications
2002 establishments in Alabama
American companies established in 2002
Telecommunications companies established in 2002